Richwood High School may refer to:

Richwood High School (Louisiana) in Ouachita Parish, Louisiana
Richwood High School (West Virginia) in Richwood, West Virginia

See also
Richwoods High School in Peoria, Illinois and formerly in Richwoods Township, Peoria County, Illinois